William George Bonin (January 8, 1947 – February 23, 1996), also known as the Freeway Killer, was an American serial killer and twice-paroled sex offender who committed the rape, torture, and murder of a minimum of twenty-one young men and boys in a series of killings in southern California from May 1979 to June 1980. On at least twelve occasions, Bonin was assisted by one of his four known accomplices; he is also suspected of committing a further fifteen murders.

Described by the prosecutor at his first trial as "the most arch-evil person who ever existed", Bonin was convicted of fourteen of the murders linked to the "Freeway Killer" in two separate trials in 1982 and 1983. He spent fourteen years on death row before he was executed by lethal injection at San Quentin State Prison in 1996. Bonin was the first inmate in California to die by this method.

Bonin became known as the "Freeway Killer", as well as the Freeway Strangler, due to the fact that the majority of his victims' bodies were discovered alongside numerous freeways in southern California. He shares this epithet with two separate and unrelated serial killers active in and around southern California in the 1970s: Patrick Kearney and Randy Kraft.

Early life

Childhood 
William George "Bill" Bonin was born in Willimantic, Connecticut, on January 8, 1947, the second of three sons – each of whom were three years apart – born to Robert Leonard Bonin Sr. (January 30, 1919 – October 11, 1980) and Alice Dorothy Bonin née Cote (July 20, 1920 – December 7, 2004). Bonin's parents were both alcoholics; his father was a machinist, an ill-tempered war veteran and gambling addict who was frequently physically abusive toward his wife in the presence of his children, and who is known to have occasionally beaten his sons during his wife's absence. In contrast, his mother was an overbearing, co-dependent and passive woman who suffered from wild mood swings and who spent much of her free time at The French Club, a local bingo parlor as her sons remained unattended at home. Often moody and bedridden, Bonin's mother seldom cooked meals for the family. There is no discussion as to whether or not his father cooked meals for the family.

Frequently arguing with his wife – who obtained a job at a local thread mill to supplement for his gambling habit – over finances, Bonin's father lost their home in Andover, Connecticut, in a high stakes poker game in January 1950, forcing the family to reside with Bonin's maternal grandmother in Willimantic and continuing to spend his money each night by gambling and drinking at local bars. Consequently, the siblings were severely neglected as children, with their parents seldom present in the household. In spite of this dysfunctional environment, Bonin and his brothers were actively raised Catholic by their parents and baptized according to church doctrine. They attended St. Mary's Catholic School where staff repeatedly made complaints of Bonin's aggression toward other students, absence from school, not paying attention in class, and an incident in which he rode his bike into a group of young girls. For this offense, Bonin was briefly placed in juvenile hall. After returning home, Bonin was reportedly more recalcitrant toward his parents than before the punishment. Receiving constant complaints from various authorities and locals regarding Bonin and his older brother's delinquency, the parents – frequently neglecting to discipline their children – began to feel stress regarding their two sons.

On September 6, 1953, Bonin's mother placed Bonin and his older brother in the Franco-American School located at 357 Pawtucket Street in Lowell, Massachusetts, in an apparent effort to protect her children from the ongoing domestic violence within the family home. This Catholic convent was known to severely discipline the children it housed for major and minor breaches of conduct, with punishments administered including harsh beatings, stress positions, repeatedly pacing staircases until exhausted, and partial drowning in sinks filled with ice water. In more extreme cases, orphans faced alleged assaults such as having their heads dunked in toilets and being threatened with knives by older children, as well as being left with hematomas on their head and buttocks from beatings received by nuns. Despite these forms of mistreatment, contemporary records indicate Bonin – a typically troublesome child – was observed by officials to function well under the controlled environment of this convent.

Bonin recollected being physically assaulted and bullied by other children at this orphanage without intervention by authorities before being defended from this peer abuse by a thirteen-year-old orphan in 1955. According to Bonin, this individual escorted him to a restroom, where Bonin agreed to sexual advances from this individual under the condition that the older boy's hands were bound with a towel to make Bonin himself feel safer. Loosing his restraints, the orphan bound and performed fellatio on Bonin before attempting to rape him and forcing Bonin to orally copulate him. Following the assault, Bonin vowed to never let this happen to him again. Later claiming in life that no abuse had taken place by staff, Bonin confessed to being forced to punch a fence by nuns when he misbehaved. As neither parent visited Bonin or his older brother – whom staff forbade from interacting with one another – at the convent, he became worried his parents had died. Bonin was to remain at the convent until May 31, 1955, when he returned to live with his parents in a home owned by Bonin's maternal grandfather located at 465 Stafford Road in Mansfield, Connecticut.

While living in Mansfield, Bonin attended Annie Vinton Elementary School with his younger brother, with whom he was frequently seen roaming town. At school, Bonin was known to classmates as a juvenile delinquent who was often in trouble or absent, poorly dressed and unkempt, aggressive with peers, had no observable friends, and was often bullied for his strange behavior. Ashamed of his sexual attraction to younger children and male teachers, Bonin isolated himself from others to whom he struggled to relate. Neighbors in Mansfield later failed to recollect either parent spending any significant time with their sons, and one neighbor – observing their unkempt, dirty and hungry condition – occasionally provided meals and clean clothes to Bonin and his younger brother out of sympathy after noting that they made their own food, and witnessing Bonin throw sharp darts at his younger brother who had been positioned against a tree.

Furthermore, from their early childhood to 1957, Bonin and his brothers were frequently placed in the care of their maternal grandfather, a child molester who had sexually abused Bonin's mother until her adulthood, and whom Bonin's mother suspected of molesting his grandsons during the prolonged instances they were under his care. In addition, Bonin's parents occasionally left Bonin and his younger brother Paul under the care of the eldest brother, Robert Jr., who – receiving the majority of their father's abuse for defending their mother – often beat and belittled his siblings. Largely devoid of consequences and parental supervision, Bonin began stealing hubcaps, license plates, and metal tags off of vehicles in town. After receiving repeated complaints by angry neighbors, Bonin's father merely yelled at his son for stealing.

In 1957, Bonin was arrested for stealing metal tags from vehicle license plates; he was placed in a juvenile detention center for these offenses and various other minor crimes. While incarcerated, he was molested by an adult counselor assigned to control and monitor the juvenile offenders. Following Bonin's release from the detention home, he began sexually fondling his younger brother. After six months, Bonin's younger brother informed their mother of the fondling, prompting his parents to force Bonin to sleep in his own bedroom. Bonin later confessed to fondling and orally copulating younger boys and stripping in the presence of a ten-year-old girl.

Adolescence 

Attending the middle school adjacent to Coventry High School in 1959 and 1960, Bonin had failing grades and isolated himself from others, at one point attempting incest with an older female cousin. In late 1960, Bonin's mother kicked his father out of their home, earning custody of her children with the court declaring his father unfit on grounds of spousal abuse and frequent drunken absences. Due to the gambling addiction of Bonin's father which resulted in the prospect of the foreclosure of the family home however, Bonin's parents reconciled and opted to relocate from Connecticut to California after Bonin's recently fired father was offered a well-paying job in Downey, California, as a machinist. In early 1962, the family relocated to 2417 West 187th St. in Torrance, California. Although both parents were generally neglectful of their children, Bonin and his brothers were primarily raised by their mother, who often displayed inordinately domineering and emasculating behavior toward Bonin.

Bonin attended North High School in Torrance, where he was regarded as a social outcast who scarcely interacted with his peers, although his younger brother later recollected Bonin as an outwardly well-behaved teenager with an apparently caring personality, whom he nicknamed "Goody-Two Shoes" for his temperament. "He'd give the clothes off his back," Paul later remarked of his brother's generosity. "If he had a bag of candy, he gave it away," Bonin's mother also later recalled of her middle son. According to Bonin, he was something of an awkward, shy loner who generally felt uncomfortable in the presence of his peers. Consequently, Bonin is not known to have formed any long-standing or close friendships throughout his adolescence. He was also self-conscious of his facial features, and refused to smile in public due to his misaligned teeth. His primary hobby as a teen was bowling, something at which he performed adequately; this hobby would last throughout the course of his teenage years. Falling asleep in class due to late nights at the bowling alley, Bonin frequently missed school and was suspended on one occasion.

By his teenage years, Bonin had developed an unrelenting and obsessive interest in pedophilia, keeping his emerging feelings for young boys a secret. His sexuality later became the basis of a long-standing conflict with his mother, who believed his sexual inclinations to be a curable social disorder. As such, the two frequently argued about his homosexual attraction. Very seldom, Bonin attempted to publicly court and/or interact with females as an adolescent. On one occasion, he was humiliated and rejected by a girl whom he had worked up his courage to approach and ask for a date. This incident wounded his self-esteem and increased Bonin's belief that he "just couldn't make it with girls" as romantic partners; he resolved to never allow a female to hurt him this deeply again. Despite this, Bonin – desiring to please his mother and appear normal – soon began dating a young girl at his high school named Linda shortly after turning seventeen, with whom he was never "completely comfortable".

Following these events, Bonin lured and molested several neighborhood children, pleading guilty to a petty theft charge for which he was fined $56 in late 1965. In early 1966, Bonin dropped out of high school and obtained employment with the help of his father. Bonin's mother – allegedly extremely emotionally controlling and protective of her son – reportedly refused to acknowledge his acts of molestation, as well as the general escalating antisocial behavior exhibited by Bonin throughout his adolescence. Unable to sleep and frequently worried he would be arrested for petty crime or crimes involving children, she prayed for him and warned him often, frustrating Bonin. Nonetheless, Bonin's mother, later expressing extreme disappointment and contempt for her middle son's sexuality and actions, evicted her son from the household on at least one occasion for undisclosed reasons. Lacking motivation and frequently borrowing money from his parents, Bonin joined the military with his mother's encouragement in December 1966.

Engagement and U.S. Air Force 
Deciding to marry upon his return home, Bonin and Linda became engaged. This engagement had largely been at the behest of his mother, with whom Bonin held a recurrent source of conflict pertaining to his evident homosexuality and who – insisting he lead a heterosexual lifestyle – believed the prospect of marriage would quell her son's sexual preferences. Bonin joined the United States Air Force with his mother's persuasion, who hoped it would cure his inclination toward chaos. He served as a cook for four months in Alaska. Bonin was then arrested for theft on October 25, 1967. As his departure was imminent, however, Bonin's case was dropped. Stationed in Phu Loi Base Camp, he served five months of active duty in the 205th Assault Support Helicopter Unit during the Vietnam War as an aerial gunner, logging over 700 hours of combat and patrol time.

Bonin was to later claim that his experiences in Vietnam instilled a belief within him that human life is overvalued and that humans generally overestimate their value in society, emphasizing feelings of power and independence while in the service. Despite this, he is known to have risked his own life on one occasion while under enemy fire to save the life of a wounded fellow airman. For this act, Bonin received a medal in recognition of his gallantry, among other medals. According to Bonin, he engaged in allegedly consensual relations with four young girls and had a "number of homosexual encounters" in Vietnam, as well as a 25-year-old female prostitute in Hong Kong, although he also confessed to sexually assaulting two soldiers under his command at gunpoint during the period of the Tet Offensive.

Bonin served nearly two years in the Air Force before receiving an honorable discharge on October 25, 1968, at age 21. Upon returning home, Bonin discovered that his fiancée – who by this stage had given birth to their son – had left him to marry another man. During Bonin's engagement, he repeatedly informed his fiancée he suffered from recurring nightmares in which he would sexually assault a faceless young woman in a deserted place before discarding her corpse in a shallow grave. According to Bonin's fiancée, he frequently woke up in tears and physically trembling from this nightmare. As a result of these concerning behaviors, the relationship was short-lived. He would later summarize his relationship with this young woman as a "big mistake" and a personal failure of his, primarily fueled by his mother's pressuring of him.

Working as a gas station attendant, Bonin – feeling betrayed and frustrated – returned to Downey to live with his parents, whom he resented for frequently requesting his help. Several family members noted a marked difference in his behavior following his military service, although Bonin refused to elaborate as to the changes in his demeanor.

First convictions 
On November 17, 1968, Bonin confronted 14-year-old Billy Jones in Arcadia, California, at 9:00 p.m. while driving his mother's white Chevrolet station wagon. Offering to take him home, the youth attempted to flee the vehicle in response to Bonin's repeated questions regarding homosexuality. Bonin growled and squeezed Jones' genitals before disclosing his sexual motive and parking behind a closed shopping center. Retrieving the youth from his vehicle and handcuffing him, Bonin choked him in the parking lot before threatening to murder and sodomize Jones if he did not comply with orders. Bonin raped the minor as he plead for his life, knocking him unconscious during the assault. Jones was then deposited at a park bench by Bonin, who threatened to kill him if he reported the assault. Returning home, his mother promptly reported Bonin to police.

On November 26, 1968, at approximately 12:00 a.m. Bonin picked up 17-year-old hitchhiker John Treadwell of Torrance. Bonin began asking him about "fags" and homosexuality before accelerating the vehicle and producing a handgun. When Bonin parked his mother's car in a secluded area, he raped the young man before threatening to kill him if he reported Bonin, claiming he had friends who would aid in avenging him if he told "The Man" of the assault. During the assault, Treadwell was bludgeoned with a tire iron.

On December 4, 1968, it was reported to the Torrance Police Department by 17-year-old Allen Pruitt that a man with medium-length dark hair and olive complexion had offered him a ride before deviating from the highway and handcuffing the boy, who was extensively sexually assaulted in the vehicle. While driving, the suspect became visibly angry before asking the minor whether he "knew there were homosexuals in this world" and homosexuality.

Five weeks later, on January 1, 1969, Bonin offered a ride to 12-year-old Lawrence Brettman in Hermosa Beach, California. Ignoring the boy's pleas to let him go, Bonin began threatening Brettman and parked north of Hawthorne Boulevard and Palos Verdes North where he forced the child to orally copulate him, molesting and robbing the boy under threat of a pistol; he then threatened to kill this victim if he ever reported the incident.

On January 12, 1969, at approximately 9:00 p.m. it was reported that Bonin had picked up 18-year-old hitchhiker Jesus Monge, asking him about homosexuality before offering him twenty dollars to orally copulate him. When Monge attempted to exit the vehicle, Bonin punched his stomach and chest before squeezing his genitals, handcuffing him, and forcing Monge to orally copulate him. During the assault, Bonin threatened Monge, stating, "I'll rip your nuts off if you don't cool it." This victim was also sodomized.

By this point, extensive efforts were being made by local police to locate a potential serial rapist that fit Bonin's description. On January 28, 1969, at 2:30 a.m., an El Segundo policewoman confronted Bonin, who had frightened 16-year-old runaway Timothy Wilson present with him in his mother's vehicle. Noting Bonin's frantic state and similar profile to the rapist, she promptly searched him and retrieved handcuffs. During the arrest, Bonin repeatedly advised her to incarcerate him before sobbing and insisting he was not responsible for his actions.

He was indicted on five counts of kidnapping, four counts of sodomy, one count of oral copulation, and one count of child molestation against the five individuals he had abducted and assaulted or – in the case of the final youth he had abducted, attempted to assault – since the previous November. In each instance, Bonin had handcuffed or otherwise restrained his victim before forcibly engaging in sodomy, oral copulation, and methods of torture which included bludgeoning about the head with a tire iron, choking one victim until he had neared unconsciousness, and the squeezing of two of his victims' testicles.

In March 1969, Bonin underwent two psychiatric examinations; he was determined to be a sexual psychopath who had little control over his impulses and showed signs of depression and inappropriate emotional responses. Initially denying early childhood abuse, Bonin confessed to being fondled at age eight and suspecting he was molested on various occasions between 9 and 12 years old. In May 1969, Bonin recounted to a probation officer his recent stressful separation and admitted his guilt in molesting male youths, although he also expressed desire to start a family and become a pilot upon his release. He also expressed a belief that his Vietnam service contributed to his criminal behavior, emphasizing his difficulties in seducing female partners since his return. In the final evaluation, he was found to be "seriously lacking insight and responsibility" for crimes committed since his childhood. Bonin pleaded guilty to molestation and forced oral copulation and was sentenced to the Atascadero State Hospital in June 1969 as a mentally disordered sex offender considered amenable to treatment.

Incarceration at Atascadero and Vacaville prison 

Bonin arrived at the Atascadero State Hospital on June 17, 1969; he was subjected to a battery of psychiatric examinations which revealed that he possessed a higher than average IQ of 121 and displayed traits of manic depression, sexual sadism disorder, and antisocial personality disorder. Though no other significant brain anomalies were present, a physical examination revealed extensive scars on Bonin's head and buttocks, which he claimed to have no memory of obtaining, but were likely sustained in the Franco-American Orphanage. This lack of acknowledgement led experts to conclude Bonin repressed memories of the more extreme aspects of his childhood abuse. These professionals also noted the psychological and emotional implications of Bonin's unhealthy relationship with his domineering mother, upon whom he remained emotionally dependent in spite of her low opinion of him, and who maintained her son was essentially "worthless as a human being".

Bonin regularly attended group therapy sessions while incarcerated at Atascadero. Psychiatrists noted his defensive, aggressive attitude toward other patients and refusal to acknowledge his homosexuality. In the presence of several patients, Bonin is known to have divulged his intentions to eliminate any future victims of his sexual assaults if he deemed necessary and he was classified as an extreme sociopath with a high probability of recidivistic behavior under periods of psychotic breakdown. His  "extremely disturbed" methods of social interaction were also viewed as hindering his own treatment.

Despite this, Bonin willingly participated in experimental programs and was generally considered a non-violent, helpful and conscientious patient by staff, reciting what he perceived psychiatrists desired to hear from him, believing he could manipulate psychiatrists into granting him an early release. One psychiatrist wrote of Bonin that he "wanted to straighten himself out, but doesn't know how to go about it."

On July 7, 1971, Bonin was sent to the California Medical Facility, having been declared unsuitable for further treatment due to repeated sexual engagement with inmates – two of whom were mentally challenged – which resulted in his being beaten on several occasions, in addition to alienating and irritating fellow patients. While in prison, Bonin was subject to further psychiatric examination which dealt with hostility toward his father and older brother, further noting his sexual behaviors were compulsive in response to stress. He also sought to raise money for the family of another prisoner, and reportedly applied willingly for at least one treatment program. Bonin was released from prison on June 11, 1974, after doctors concluded he was "no longer a danger to the health and safety of others".

Further offenses and imprisonment 
In July 1974, Bonin rented an apartment in Hollywood with intentions of circulating within the adult gay community, but was largely unsuccessful due to poor social skills and soon relocated to his parents' new house on 10282 Angell Street in Downey, California, while briefly working as a bartender in Fountain Valley. Switching his job for employment as a truck driver at a Montebello delivery firm named Dependable Drive-Away in December 1974, his employment was terminated in February 1975 for  wrecking a trailer. In March 1975, Bonin attended community college classes following his termination and picked up hitchhikers for potential sexual partners, eventually establishing a serious relationship with a single mother.

While cruising for young boys on September 8, 1975, at approximately 7:00 p.m. he encountered 14-year-old David Allen McVicker hitchhiking in the city of Garden Grove. McVicker accepted Bonin's offer to drive him to his parents' home in Huntington Beach. Shortly after McVicker entered Bonin's Opel Kadett, he asked him whether he had engaged in homosexuality or was homosexual. McVicker replied that he had not, asking to leave the vehicle, prompting Bonin to accelerate the vehicle.

When McVicker attempted to leave the car, Bonin produced a gun and drove McVicker to a deserted field, ordering McVicker to undress, and then beating him. Bonin then forced oral copulation on McVicker before raping him as he simultaneously strangled him with his T-shirt and a tire iron in the front seat of his car. With little breath left, McVicker pleaded for his life stating, "God, help!" Bonin immediately ceased his assault and apologized before reverting to casual conversation. He then masturbated into a rag before driving McVicker to his home, stating on the way, "You know what? You're an alright guy. I was going to kill you but I want to come back for you and use you again." As McVicker was leaving Bonin's vehicle, Bonin further remarked, "We'll meet again."

McVicker cried for several hours before calling a child abuse hotline. He then phoned his mother, who promptly informed Garden Grove police of the incident. Bonin was arrested months later for the two assaults on October 11, 1975. When arrested, he informed law enforcement that "next time there won't be any more witnesses." He was subsequently charged with the rape and forcible oral copulation of a minor, and the attempted abduction of a 15-year-old boy two days after Bonin's assault on McVicker. This second victim rejected Bonin's offer of $35 for sex before exiting Bonin's van and telling him to leave. In response, he drove the van onto the sidewalk in an attempt to strike the victim.

Bonin pleaded guilty to both charges and on December 31, 1975, he was sentenced to serve between one and fifteen years' imprisonment at the California Men's Facility in San Luis Obispo. In 1977, Bonin was subject to further psychiatric examination; the results of this evaluation indicated his sexual involvement with young boys related to his mother's micromanagement of his life. In March 1978, Bonin's father suffered a major stroke – presumably induced by his long-standing alcohol addiction – causing him to be hospitalized at the Long Beach Veterans Administration Hospital where his mother worked as a vocational nurse. In prison, Bonin completed over 2,400 hours of vocational training as a machinist and secured employment, showing significant progress in individual therapy sessions. As a result, Bonin was released from detention on October 11, 1978, albeit with eighteen months' supervised probation.

Release 
On November 1, 1978, Bonin moved to an apartment complex at the Kingswood Village complex in Downey, located approximately one mile from his parents' house. He then became acquainted with 43-year-old neighbor and ex-bank officer Everett Scott Fraser. Bonin became a regular attendee at Fraser's parties – held almost every night of the week for the next several months – where young men, drugs, and alcohol were rife. Fraser considered Bonin a respectful, polite and placid individual to whom he frequently introduced his young male acquaintances, with the two also exchanging stories of their homosexual exploits and penchant for sex with teenage boys. 

The following month, Bonin established a relationship with a married mother who held a criminal record for child cruelty named Mary, whom he accompanied to Anaheim on Sundays to partake in her hobby of roller skating,  in addition to attending church services and bowling together. Bonin also often spent time with her children and included them in these events. Months later in April 1979, Bonin's parole supervision concluded. 

Shortly thereafter, Bonin and his younger brother Paul – who worked as a plumber – relocated to the rural community of Silverado, California, and ran a neighborhood bar called the Alpine Inn. As the establishment was continually under scrutiny for noise violations, Bonin reportedly locked a 16-year-old runaway in one of the rooms, threatening to bury him in the hills at knife-point. Unable to obtain a permanent liquor license as a result of Bonin's criminal record, the business venture was short-lived. On July 19, 1979, Bonin purchased a 1972 Ford E-100 Shorty Van while still living in Silverado with his younger brother, whom he briefly worked for under his new plumbing business.

Acquaintance with Vernon Butts 

Through his frequent attendance at Fraser's parties, Bonin became acquainted with 21-year-old porcelain factory worker, occultist, and part-time magician Vernon Robert Butts and 18-year-old Gregory Matthews Miley. Born and raised in Norwalk, Butts was nine years old when his father died, and reportedly hailed from a broken home. Described by acquaintances as "shy and easily led" by others, Butts attempted suicide on three occasions prior to meeting Bonin and held an obsession with death and witchcraft.

At the time of his initial acquaintance with Bonin, Butts – an avid reader of horror fiction who frequently cosplayed as fictional characters such as Darth Vader – had developed a local reputation as an eccentric figure who adorned his apartment with novelty spiders and who kept two coffins in his apartment, one of which was used as a phone booth, and another as a coffee table in which Butts made love to his girlfriend, Pam "Cati" Razook, a self-proclaimed witch with whom he attended Pagan religious ritual events and visited graveyards. Butts also held suspicion that his apartment was haunted by ghosts, and had recently been fired from his employment as a magic store clerk at Knott's Berry Farm due to his unkempt appearance and increasingly strange and unpredictable behavior. Actively bisexual and frequently abusing drugs and alcohol, Butts performed public magic acts at schools, privately for small groups, and for children's parties in which he charged $30 per show to perform for audiences.

A drifter who had been in and out of penal institutions, Butts was later speculated by court prosecutors to have developed a fascination with sadistic homosexual activity while in jail. Although Butts held an extensive criminal record for offenses such as burglary and arson, he claimed to have been both enamored with and terrified of Bonin, whom he claimed held a "kind of hypnotic" control over him. In contrast, Bonin held Butts in high regard for his social popularity and for empowering him, describing the young man as very intelligent. Although both lived externally heterosexual lifestyles, the two soon became lovers, with Butts also introducing Bonin to the tabletop role-playing game Dungeons & Dragons, in which Butts organized and advertised weekly gaming events at his residence. Butts also held "Mystery Parties" in which up to sixteen people searched for various murder artifacts in the city of Downey, such as a hairpin or ice pick. As a result, Bonin and Butts frequently discussed the subject of death.

Months later, Bonin suggested that they rape and murder a teenage hitchhiker during one of these discussions. Butts was amenable to this suggestion, and later freely admitted to taking great delight in watching Bonin abuse and torture his victims in the rear of his van as he (Butts) drove the vehicle. Nonetheless, Butts insisted he had primarily participated in the murders out of fear of Bonin, who on one occasion had arrived at his residence unannounced after Butts had discreetly changed his address without informing him.

Miley – an illiterate Texas native and high school dropout with an IQ of 56 who supported himself with casual work – also actively participated in two murders he accompanied Bonin upon. Raised in Lakewood, Miley's mother had a series of reportedly dysfunctional marriages and severely neglected him. Miley – who viewed Bonin as something of a father figure– often accompanied Bonin against his mother's wishes to watch movies, buy clothes, and visit restaurants in exchange for their sexual relationship. Bonin himself later confessed to a psychologist his feeling a sense of social belonging with his accomplices in murder that he had never previously experienced with any other individuals.

Murders 

Bonin usually selected young male hitchhikers, schoolboys or, occasionally, male prostitutes as his victims. The victims, aged 12 to 19, were predominantly Caucasian or Latino, slender, pale, long-haired youths whom he either enticed or forced into his Ford Econoline van, where they were overpowered and bound hand and foot with a combination of handcuffs and wire or cords. They were then sexually assaulted, extensively beaten about the face, torso, head and genitals, and tortured before typically being killed by strangulation with their own T-shirts and a tire iron while letting them fade in and out of consciousness, although some victims were stabbed or battered to death. One victim, Darin Kendrick, was forced to drink hydrochloric acid; three victims had ice-picks driven into their ears and another victim, Mark Shelton, died of shock from impaling.

According to one attorney present throughout Bonin's subsequent confessions, the escalating levels of brutality he had exhibited toward his victims had been similar to that of a drug addict requiring an ever-greater increase of dosage to attain a satisfactory level of euphoria. Bonin himself later likened his homicidal urges to that of an addiction, emphasizing to neurologists his scarcely being able to wait for the onset of dusk to begin his cruising and referencing his feelings of extreme restlessness and sexual frustration in the hours prior to his murders, emphasizing that he had felt an intense sense of excitement as he drove in search of his victims. Reserving Sundays for his girlfriend, he typically cruised the freeways on Fridays and Saturdays. Bonin also later described his feeling pleasure at hearing his victims scream, as well as sodomizing his victims – particularly in an upright position – without lubricant, causing them to rectally bleed and tear.

In order to minimize the chances of a potential victim escaping from his vehicle, Bonin removed all inner handles from the passenger-side and rear doors of his van. He also stowed ligatures, knives, pliers, wire coat hangers, and other such instruments in his vehicle to facilitate the restraining and torture of his victims. The victims were usually killed inside his van before their bodies were discarded alongside or close to various freeways in southern California. In an apparent effort to avoid investigators connecting his crimes, Bonin often drove to various counties to discard his victims' bodies far from the site of their abduction. Dr. Albert Rosenstein, a forensic psychologist, predicted their killer was an intelligent sex offender in his late twenties or early thirties, had spent time in a psychiatric facility, was abused as a child, and that while bisexual, the killer "has [never] become comfortable with the homosexual side of his personality" and is repulsed by his actions, as is evidenced by the gruesome mutilation of his victims.

In a minimum of twelve of the murders, Bonin – who considered murder a "group sport" – was assisted by one or more of his four known accomplices. Scrapbooking newspaper clippings of his murders, Bonin would later hold up newspapers to accomplice Vernon Butts and acquaintance Everett Fraser and boast of which murders he had committed. In discussion of the killings with acquaintances, Bonin remarked "this guy is giving good gays like us a bad name." Following media coverage of his murders, Bonin also enthusiastically mentioned his killings to fellow co-workers at Dependable Drive-Away, stating, "He did it again. ... They found another one, a strangler victim." To those unaware of his crimes, Bonin – who made daily trips to Orange County to buy newspapers – reportedly "seemed obsessed" with the case.

First murder 

The first murder for which Bonin was charged was that of 13-year-old Thomas Glen Lundgren. Lundgren was last seen leaving his parents' house in Reseda at 10:50 a.m. on May 28, 1979. Shortly before his abduction, Lundgren had reportedly told friends a man had offered to meet him at a skatepark to take photos of him for a skateboarding magazine.

His body, clad only in a T-shirt, shoes and socks, was found the same afternoon in Agoura. An autopsy revealed that Lundgren had suffered emasculation and extensive bludgeoning "from an object like a tire jack handle" to his face and head, with his skull sustaining multiple fractures. In addition, the youth had been slashed across the throat, extensively stabbed about the chest and stomach, and strangled to death. His underwear, jeans, and severed genitals – bearing several bite marks – were discovered strewn in a field close to his body.

An expert later postulated that Bonin's brutality was likely an attempt to "kill" his homosexual attraction to Lundgren, further "silencing" his desire with each subsequent stabbing. In the abduction and murder of Lundgren, Bonin was assisted by Butts, who is suspected of accompanying or assisting Bonin on at least eight further murders attributed to the "Freeway Killer".

Subsequent killings 
On August 4, 1979, Bonin drove from Silverado Canyon to a drive-in movie theater to spend time with Butts in Westminster; he soon suggested that they rape and murder a teenage hitchhiker. Butts was amenable to this suggestion, and Bonin offered 17-year-old Mark Shelton $400 for sexual services shortly after the youth left his home to walk to a movie theater near Beach Boulevard. According to Bonin, he masturbated Shelton before Butts began squeezing his genitals, prompting the boy to scream. As Bonin drove into the Cajon Pass in San Bernardino County, Butts entertained the boy with magic tricks before orally copulating him. Reaching an abandoned gas station, Bonin parked the vehicle and coaxed Shelton to orally copulate him and endure rape. Enraged with Shelton's fear and resistance, Bonin immediately beat the youth, squeezing his genitals and driving his knee into his face until he lost consciousness. Shelton was then twice strangled over a fifteen-minute period with Butts' assistance. He was also violated with foreign objects including a stick, causing his body to enter a state of shock which proved fatal before being discarded beside a gravel road in the Cajon Pass of San Bernardino County.

The following day, Bonin and Butts encountered 17-year-old West German student Markus Grabs between 6 p.m. and 10 p.m. attempting to hitchhike from the Pacific Coast Highway. According to Bonin, he engaged in consensual relations with the youth, who agreed to be bound with lengths of cord and ignition wire. Bonin then retrieved a Buck Knife, proceeding to intimidate Grabs as Butts drove toward Bonin's home where the youth was again sodomized and beaten. When Bonin began squeezing his genitals during the rape, Grabs reportedly broke loose and punched his assailant, causing Bonin to repeatedly stab him for an extensive period. Grabs was partially strangled, and revealed to have been stabbed a total of 77 times – again postulated by various experts to be an attempt to "kill" his homosexuality – before his nude body was discarded in Malibu Creek, close to Las Virgenes Canyon Road. His body was found at approximately 6:30 a.m. the following day, with one investigator likening the network of injuries inflicted upon the victim to that of a rabid dog unable to determine when to cease biting. 

On August 9, 1979, Bonin was again detained for molesting a 17-year-old boy in the coastal community of Dana Point. This violation of the conditions of his parole should have resulted in Bonin being returned to prison; however, an administrative error committed prior to Bonin's scheduled court date resulted in his release. On August 13, 1979, Fraser drove to collect Bonin from the Orange County Jail where he had been incarcerated. He later recollected that as he drove Bonin home, Bonin made a statement which Fraser had interpreted at the time as an expression of remorse: "No one's going to testify again. This is never going to happen to me again." Resuming his murder spree, Bonin did not bother to appear for his court appointment. By this period, Bonin had also returned to his parents' house where he gradually developed a reputation as a child molester among local residents due to his habit of inviting young boys into the household – occasionally as his mother, younger brother, and others were present – under the guise of providing free alcohol and viewing pornography with them. Some neighbors later recollected frequently observing young boys accompany Bonin into the residence, some of whom they would later hear screaming and crying once inside the residence. In spite of this, his mother and younger brother claimed to have never witnessed Bonin abuse any youths.

On August 20, 1979, Bonin picked up 18-year-old Robert Wirostek, who was cycling to a grocery store in Newport Beach before Bonin allegedly coaxed him by offering him $50 to perform acts of oral copulation. He then bound and raped the boy at knife-point before driving to Butts' residence. While driving on Interstate 10, Butts orally copulated the youth before repeatedly striking him and taking Bonin's place behind the wheel, who then tortured Wirostek by bending his fingers and squeezing his genitals before extensively bludgeoning him with a tire iron and strangling him with his T-shirt and a tire iron. The young man's body was found on September 27 alongside Interstate 10.

On August 27, 1979, Bonin and Butts abducted 15-year-old Hollywood youth Donald Ray Hyden at approximately 1:00 a.m. on Santa Monica Boulevard. To reach the youth, Bonin recklessly crossed two lanes in the presence of police, causing Butts – who had been pretending to sleep in the back of the van – to laugh. Fearful of Butts, Bonin reassured Hyden and offered him $50 for sexual services, soon engaging in consensual intercourse as Butts drove the van. When Butts made an accidental wrong turn, the youth became frantic, causing Bonin to extensively beat and bind the victim before torturing his genitals and sodomizing him. Butts then threatened Hyden, stating he "entered the Death Van, and when someone enters, they don't go out alive." Promising to leave him unconscious somewhere, Bonin informed the boy he was to be killed while strangling him with a bandana and tire iron. Allegedly, Butts orally copulated Hyden's corpse before the pair dumped the body at a construction site near the Ventura Freeway to be discovered hours later. Prior to his death by ligature strangulation, Hyden had been bound, beaten about the face, sodomized, then stabbed in the neck and genitalia and bludgeoned about the skull. Evident attempts had also been made to remove his testicles and slash his throat, and his rectum was found bleeding and extensively distended, leading a coroner to opine he had been impaled by a large object.

On September 9, 1979, Bonin encountered 17-year-old La Mirada youth David Louis Murillo cycling to a movie theater. After entering the van, Bonin offered him money for sex which was refused. He then attempted to fondle Murillo before binding him and driving to Butts' residence. As Butts drove, Bonin forced the boy to orally copulate him before squeezing his genitals and sodomizing him. He then traded places with Butts, who orally copulated and beat Murillo before squeezing his genitals in frustration at the youth's lack of sexual excitement. They then parked the vehicle at a secluded spot where he was bound, repeatedly raped by Bonin and Butts, extensively bludgeoned about the chest, neck, and skull with a tire iron, then strangled with a ligature before his nude body was thrown out of the van and over an embankment into a bed of ivy alongside Highway 101. His nude body was discovered on September 12, 1979. Following this incident, Butts reportedly began exhibiting extremely bizarre behavior, at one point putting an ax blade to a close friend's throat and stating, "I'd like to see your blood gush out and hear your screams."

This victim was savagely beaten repeatedly by both captors, then strangled to death by Bonin before his fully clothed body was discarded in an irrigation ditch alongside State Route 99, south of Bakersfield. During the ordeal, Bonin allegedly asked the victim whether he knew why he "had to die." He then further explained why, stating, "Your folks paid us to find you and kill you." Bonin strangled the youth before inserting an ice pick into his nostrils and right ear.

Approximately four weeks later, on November 30, Bonin – operating alone – abducted 17-year-old Bellflower youth Frank Dennis Fox; during the process of ligature strangulation, Bonin had killed the youth while still sodomizing him. His body was found two days later alongside the Ortega Highway, five miles east of San Juan Capistrano. The body bore signs of extensive blunt force trauma to the face and head, with ligature marks on the wrists and ankles indicating Fox had been bound throughout his ordeal. No clothing or other identifying evidence was discovered at the scene.

Ten days after the murder of Fox, 15-year-old Long Beach youth John Fredrick Kilpatrick was offered money for sexual services after leaving his parents' home to socialize with friends. After engaging in mutual oral copulation, the teenager was bound and raped by Bonin in the van before being transported to his parents' house, where he was extensively flagellated with string until he cried and strangled to death with the aforementioned string. Kilpatrick's body was discarded in a remote area of Rialto. His body was found on December 13; Kilpatrick remained known as a John Doe until August 5, 1980. Because Kilpatrick – a troubled youth whose parents had recently divorced – was known to disappear for days at a time, his mother hesitated to report the disappearance. His friends also mistakenly reported seeing him at the mall. As a result, he was not reported missing until February.

On January 1, 1980, Bonin encountered 16-year-old Ontario youth Michael Francis McDonald near the Chino Airport. Under the guise of providing drugs for him to sell, Bonin parked behind an apartment building before binding the boy by knife-point. Beating the youth into submission, McDonald orally copulated Bonin before being subject to genital squeezing and rape in the van. His fully clothed body was found alongside Highway 71 in the outskirts of Chino, although his body was not identified until March 24.

Participation of Gregory Miley

Murders of Miranda and Macabe 

On the morning of February 3, 1980, Bonin invited a 16-year-old boy into his parents' house to drink and engage in intercourse. When Bonin briefly departed to urinate, he allegedly caught the youth stealing $100 from his billfold. Furious, Bonin resolved to commit a murder. Later that evening, Bonin drove from Downey to Hollywood with Gregory Miley with the specific intention of committing a murder with him. They encountered 15-year-old Charles Miranda standing close to the Starwood nightclub, hitchhiking along Santa Monica Boulevard.

According to Miley, Bonin and Miranda engaged in consensual intercourse in the rear of the van as he drove, before Bonin privily stammered to him, "Kid's going to die. Kid's going to – this kid's going to die." Miley replied, stating, "Why don't you just let the kid go?" Bonin rejected this proposition, stating, "No, because he'll know us and know the van." Miranda was then overpowered by Bonin, who asked Miranda how much money he had. Miranda said he had about six dollars, after which Bonin told Miley to take Miranda's wallet; then Bonin beat, bound, and gagged Miranda. He then informed Miranda of his being robbed earlier that day, and that though it "wasn't fair," the youth was to be killed. Initially doubting Bonin, Miranda began crying and begging for his life. Bonin then began sexually assaulting Miranda; Miley also attempted to rape Miranda, but was unable to sustain an erection. In frustration, Miley assaulted the youth with various sharp objects before assisting Bonin in beating him. Bonin then strangled Miranda to death with a T-shirt and a tire iron as Miley repeatedly jumped on Miranda's chest. His nude corpse was dumped shortly thereafter, in an alleyway alongside East Second Street in Los Angeles.

Five minutes after the pair had discarded Miranda's body, Bonin suggested to Miley: "I'm horny again, let's go and do another one." Miley initially protested and stated he wanted to go home, but eventually complied with Bonin's insistence. A few hours later, in Huntington Beach, the pair encountered 12-year-old James Macabe standing at a bus stop on the corner of Beach Boulevard and Slater Avenue. Temporarily left alone, Macabe had been dropped off there by his older brother, who had given Macabe money and with whom he stayed for the weekend. Macabe was lured into Bonin's van on the promise he would be driven to his intended destination of Disneyland with the additional incentive of marijuana. According to Miley, Macabe entered the rear of the van voluntarily, after which Bonin drove to a grocery store parking lot, parking the van and entering the rear of the vehicle, where he began hugging and kissing the child. He then bound Macabe, telling him he was being kidnapped for ransom.

To subdue the child, Bonin began repeatedly punching him in the stomach, mouth, and leg. Miley then drove in an aimless manner for what he later described as being a "very, very long distance" as he repeatedly heard Macabe crying as Bonin raped Macabe and bludgeoned him about the head with a tire iron. Bonin then forced Macabe to sleep in his arms. Upon Macabe's waking, Miley joined Bonin in beating the child into unconsciousness simply because he "felt like" doing so before Bonin crushed Macabe's neck with a tire iron. Bonin then strangled Macabe to death with his own T-shirt before the pair discarded his corpse alongside a dumpster at a construction site in Walnut City. Macabe's body was discovered three days later, fully clothed, bearing several skull fractures and a bruised penis. Following the murder of Macabe, Bonin and Miley spent the money retrieved from his wallet for lunch.

One day after Miranda and Macabe's murder, Bonin was arrested for violating the conditions of his parole; he was remanded in custody at the Orange County Jail until March 4.

March 1980 

Throughout his adult life, Bonin worked in a series of menial professions such as the aforementioned bartendering profession and taxi driving. None of these jobs lasted a significant length of time, and he was frequently unemployed. Following his release, he obtained more secure employment as a truck driver at his former Montebello workplace at Dependable Drive-Away, earning $5 an hour. While delivering trucks, Bonin frequently argued with his boss – who was unaware of his status as a sex offender – for picking up a hitchhiker in his presence on one occasion and taking longer, unnecessary routes which detectives later took interest in.

Ten days after Bonin's release from custody, on March 14, he abducted 18-year-old Van Nuys youth Ronald Gatlin; after assaulting the youth, Bonin began hacking at Gatlin's face with an ice pick. Gatlin was beaten and sodomized, suffering several deep, perforating ice pick wounds to the ear and neck before being strangled with a ligature. He also bore signs of extensive beating. The following day, his bound body was found behind an industrial building in the city of Duarte.

One week later, on March 21, Bonin offered a ride to 14-year-old hitchhiker Glenn Norman Barker. Barker was also beaten and raped with objects, then strangled with a ligature; his neck had numerous burns made by a cigarette and his rectum was extensively distended.

At approximately 4:07 p.m. the same day, 15-year-old Russell Duane Rugh was abducted from a bus stop in Garden Grove. Rugh intended on hitching a ride to his job at a fast food restaurant before encountering Bonin. He was bound, beaten and strangled to death after an estimated eight hours of captivity before his body was discarded alongside that of Barker in Cleveland National Forest, close to the Ortega Highway. Both nude bodies were found on March 23, and both bore evidence of extensive beating and ligature marks on their wrists, ankles, and neck.

Encounter with William Pugh 
One Friday evening in March 1980, Bonin offered 17-year-old William Ray Pugh a ride home as the pair left Fraser's residence. Within minutes of accepting the ride, Bonin asked Pugh whether he would like to engage in sex with him. Pugh later stated he panicked and stuttered upon hearing this question and, after sitting in silence for several minutes, attempted to leave the vehicle once Bonin had slowed the van at a stoplight. In response, Bonin seized Pugh by the collar, dragging him back into the passenger seat.

According to Pugh, Bonin entered an irritable state before confiding in him that he enjoyed abducting young male hitchhikers on Friday and Saturday nights so he had time to take his girlfriend roller-skating on Sundays, adding that he restrained and abused youths before strangling them to death with their own T-shirts. In a matter-of-fact tone, Bonin then informed Pugh: "If you want to kill somebody, you should make a plan and find a place to dump the body before you even pick a victim." Bonin further explained that he had not chosen to refrain from sexually assaulting and murdering Pugh out of sentiment; he had been spared because the pair had been seen leaving Fraser's party together. Pugh was driven to a home he claimed was his, before fearfully sprinting to his residence upon the van's departing.

Murder of Harry Turner 

On March 25, 1980, Bonin and Pugh abducted 15-year-old runaway Harry Todd Turner from a Los Angeles street. Turner had absconded from a boys' home in the desert community of Lancaster four days prior to his meeting Bonin and Pugh. Pugh was to later testify that he and Bonin lured Turner into Bonin's van with an offer of $20 for sex. After binding and sodomizing the youth, Bonin bit into Turner's penis until it tore and bled.

Bonin then ordered Pugh to "beat him (Turner) up." After Pugh had bludgeoned and beat Turner about the head and body for several minutes, Bonin strangled Turner to death with his own T-shirt and a tire iron before discarding his body at the rear delivery door to a Los Angeles business. His genitals were mutilated and he had eight skull fractures inflicted by a blunt instrument.

Further murders 
On April 10, Bonin was discharged from parole following his March 4, 1980, release. He encountered 16-year-old Bellflower youth Steven John Wood walking to school. Wood's older brother had introduced him to Bonin, so he willingly entered Bonin's van. His nude, hogtied and extensively beaten body was discarded in a Long Beach alleyway beside a dumpster, with his head resting against a nearby bench close to the Pacific Coast Highway. Wood's autopsy revealed the youth had been killed by ligature strangulation. Prior to disposing of Wood's body, Bonin allegedly drove to a scheduled job interview before eating pizza as he awaited the onset of dusk to safely discard the corpse.

Four weeks later, on April 29, Bonin encountered 19-year-old supermarket employee Darin Kendrick while parked in the grounds of the Stanton supermarket where Kendrick worked. Bonin lured Kendrick into his van on the pretext of selling the youth drugs. Bonin then drove to Butts' apartment in Lakewood, where the trio began listening to music as they sat on the couch. When Bonin asked Kendrick whether he was gay, Kendrick attempted to flee, but Bonin and Butts overpowered and bound him and Butts sodomized him; Bonin raised the volume of Butts' sound system to cover Kendrick's screams. Butts then held Kendrick's mouth open while Bonin poured chloral hydrate down his throat, causing Kendrick to sustain caustic chemical burns to his mouth, chin, stomach and chest.

Kendrick – who had fiercely fought his attackers, including biting the two men – then halted his resistance as he vomited onto the apartment floor before complaining of dizziness. Noting that Kendrick was losing consciousness and whimpering, Bonin achieved orgasm; he then strangled Kendrick as Butts drove an ice pick into Kendrick's ear, causing a fatal wound to the youth's cervical spinal cord. His body was discarded behind a warehouse close to the Artesia Freeway, with the ice pick still protruding from his ear.

On May 12, 1980 Bonin abducted and murdered an acquaintance whom he later stated he had decided to kill when he had awoken that morning because he was "tired of having him around". The body of 17-year-old Lawrence Sharp was discarded behind a Westminster gas station. His body was found on May 18, and his autopsy revealed that in addition to being bound and sodomized, Sharp had been extensively beaten about the face and body, then strangled with a ligature.

One week after the murder of Sharp, on the afternoon of May 19, Bonin asked Butts to accompany him on a killing; on this occasion, however, Butts reportedly refused to accompany him. Operating alone, Bonin abducted 14-year-old South Gate youth Sean King from a bus stop in Downey. King was strangled to death before his body was discarded in Live Oak Canyon, Yucaipa. Bonin then visited Butts' residence and bragged of the killing to his accomplice.

Surveillance 

By early 1980, the murders committed by Bonin and his accomplices were receiving considerable media attention, and a reward totaling $50,000 for information leading to the conviction of the perpetrator or perpetrators had been offered by leading gay rights activists. Bonin avidly followed news media reports pertaining to his crimes, and collected newspaper clippings documenting his own manhunt, often tuning in on radio and television coverage of the murders along with his accomplices.

Having by this stage determined a definitive link between many of the murders committed within the previous year, investigators from the various jurisdictions where victims had been abducted or discovered had themselves begun sharing information in their collective hunt for the perpetrator. Six officers from three of the jurisdictions in which the "Freeway Killer" had most regularly either abducted or deposited the bodies of his victims formed a task force dedicated to the apprehension of the suspect or suspects who, as one of the officers upon this assembled task force later recalled, was striking at an average rate of once every two weeks in the spring of 1980.

By May 1980, Pugh had been arrested for auto theft and was housed at the Los Padrinos Juvenile Courthouse. On May 28, he overheard the details of the ongoing murders on a local radio broadcast and confided to a counselor his recognition of the perpetrator's modus operandi as being that described to him by Bonin two months previous. This counselor reported Pugh's suspicions to the police, who in turn relayed the information to Los Angeles Police Department (LAPD) homicide sergeant John St. John. Upon hearing the confidential tip from the counselor, St. John conducted an extensive interview with Pugh the following day. Although Pugh withheld the fact that he had accompanied Bonin on one of his murders, the information he provided led St. John to deduce that Bonin might be the Freeway Killer.

Acquaintance with James Munro 

The same day Pugh had informed police of Bonin's involvement, Bonin invited 18-year-old homeless drifter James Michael Munro – whom he had encountered while cruising for young male prostitutes – to move into the Angell Street home he shared with his mother and older brother, but only in exchange for sex. Munro was a runaway from St. Clair, Michigan, who had been evicted from his family's home in early 1980. Munro had planned on meeting a friend in California, but "ended up living on the streets" following an incident in which he had been robbed of money he had saved from working as a male prostitute in Hollywood.

While at the Angell Street residence, Munro – who was bisexual and preferred sexual relations with females – began a consensual sexual relationship with Bonin. He also accepted a subsequent offer of employment at the Montebello delivery firm where Bonin worked, and was allowed by Bonin to drive his van on occasion. Munro later described his initial impression of Bonin as being "a good guy; really normal". On June 1, Bonin took Munro roller-skating with his girlfriend before abruptly informing Munro that night that he wanted them both to abduct, sexually assault, and murder a teenage hitchhiker.

A police investigation into Bonin's background revealed his extensive history of convictions for sexually assaulting teenage boys. St. John assigned a surveillance team to monitor Bonin's movements. The surveillance of Bonin began on the evening of June 2 – one hour prior to Bonin and Munro discarding the body of the final "Freeway Killer" victim.

Murder of Steven Wells 
Hours prior to the implementation of police surveillance of Bonin on the evening of June 2, he, accompanied by Munro, encountered 18-year-old print shop worker Steven Jay Wells standing at a bus stop on El Segundo Boulevard. Bonin and Munro enticed the youth into the van. According to Bonin and Munro, upon learning Wells was bisexual, Bonin engaged in consensual relations with Wells in the rear of his van before persuading the youth to accompany him to his parents' house, where the two engaged in further sexual relations on Bonin's parents' bed. Bonin then sent Munro to purchase burgers. Upon Munro's return, Bonin convinced Wells to allow himself to be bound with clothesline upon the incentive of being given $200. He then called Munro to enter the room. Suspicious of their intentions, Wells became frantic.

Bonin then retreated to the kitchen for water, informing Munro they were to both kill Wells before gagging and beating Wells in the hallway, stating, "You're going to do what I tell you to do" as Wells pled for his life. Bonin smiled as he stole $10 from Wells' wallet, stating his intention to leave his body "on a park bench somewhere". He then strangled Wells to death with a T-shirt and tire iron; Munro asked whether Wells was dead, prompting Bonin to laugh as he replied, "Yeah, stupid" before adding: "Haven't you ever seen a dead body before?" Bonin then threw Wells' T-shirt across the hallway before ordering Munro – who had retreated to the driveway to breathe – to retrieve a cardboard box from his older brother's room; the two placed Wells' body inside this cardboard box, which they then carried to Bonin's van.

At approximately 9 p.m., the two drove to Butts' Lakewood apartment as Bonin informed Munro that he, Butts, and others had committed many of the "Freeway Killer" murders. At Butts' apartment, the trio engaged in brief conversation before Bonin invited Butts to view Wells' body with the enticement: "We got it in the van; it's a good one. Come on out and see it." According to Munro, Butts – who had been dressed in a Darth Vader costume – prodded the body before replying, "Oh, you got another one!" He then complimented Bonin, stating: "Good job, Billy, you really did a good one."

Bonin subsequently asked for advice as to where to dispose of the corpse. At Bonin's subsequent trial, Munro recalled Butts recommending they discard Wells near a gas station. Munro also later testified that Butts had actively dissuaded Bonin from discarding Wells' body in the nearby canyons due to the late hour, and general police presence caused by recent media coverage. As they drove to find a spot to dump the body, they encountered a police car, causing Bonin to privately mock the officers. They drove to a disused gas station in Huntington Beach, where they wedged Wells' nude corpse between a chain-link fence and a truck. The body was discovered five hours later by two brothers who had parked nearby to fix a flat tire.

Returning to Bonin's parents' home, Bonin and Munro watched television in search of news coverage of Wells' discovery. As he bit into his hamburger, Bonin reportedly looked up to the ceiling and stated, "Thanks, Steve," before repeating the statement as he looked down to the floor, adding, "Wherever you are." Bonin and Munro both laughed. Later that night, Bonin hinted to Munro – already fearful for his life – that he stay quiet regarding Wells' murder or else face potential death.

Arrest 
After nine days of uneventful surveillance in which Bonin worked at Dependable Drive-Away, visited friends, and returned to his residence, on June 11, 1980, police observed Bonin driving in a seemingly random manner throughout Hollywood, unsuccessfully attempting to lure five separate teenage boys into his van before succeeding in luring a youth into his vehicle. The police followed Bonin until his van parked in a service station parking lot close to the Hollywood Freeway, then discreetly approached the vehicle. Upon hearing muffled screams and banging sounds emanating from inside the van, these plainclothes officers forced their way into the vehicle; discovering Bonin in the act of raping 17-year-old Orange County runaway Harold Eugene Tate, whom he had handcuffed and bound.

Initially charged with the rape of a minor and held on suspicion of the murder of Miranda, Bonin was detained in lieu of $250,000 bond. Shortly thereafter, Bonin's girlfriend notified his boss of his arrest, adding that the arrest was in connection to the Freeway Killer case and causing Munro – already apprehensive at Bonin's absence from work that day – to become frantic. The following day, Munro stole Bonin's car and fled to his native Michigan, where he resided temporarily with a friend before his arrest.

Inside Bonin's van, investigators discovered numerous artifacts attesting to his culpability in the Freeway Killer murders. These items included various restraining devices including lengths of nylon cord, an assortment of knives, a tire iron, and household implements such as pliers and wire coat hangers. Furthermore, a forensic examination of the interior of Bonin's van and, later, sections of his home revealed extensive traces of bloodstains. Moreover, the inner handles from the passenger-side and rear doors of his vehicle had been removed in an obvious effort to prevent victims from escaping the vehicle. Inside the glove box, investigators also discovered a scrapbook of newspaper clippings related to the murders.

Confession 

Although initially alleging his innocence in the murders, Bonin confessed his guilt to St. John after reading an impassioned letter from the mother of victim Sean King, imploring him to reveal the location of her son's body. Bonin made sure to clarify, however, that it was not to ease the mother's pain, but the knowledge that because King was buried in San Bernardino County, police would likely buy him a hamburger for lunch on the extensive trip, stating, "I was dying for a hamburger and I knew [that] if I went out with the cops, they would get me a hamburger."

Over the course of several evenings, Bonin confessed to abducting, raping, and killing twenty-one young men and boys in increasingly graphic detail. He expressed no remorse for his actions, but he did demonstrate extreme embarrassment and regret over having been caught. An Orange County investigator later recalled that there "was not a policeman in that room that did not want to kill Bonin" for his confession. Bonin stated to authorities that his primary accomplice in the murders had been Butts, with Miley and Munro being active accomplices in other murders.

Bonin was physically linked to many of the murders by blood and semen stains, and numerous, distinctive green triskelion-shaped carpet fibers found upon seven of the victims' bodies which were forensically proven to be a precise match with the carpeting in the rear of Bonin's van. Furthermore, upon three victims' bodies, investigators had discovered hair samples which were proven to be a precise match with Bonin. Medical evidence also revealed that six of the murders for which Bonin was charged were committed by a unique windlass strangulation method, which was later referred to by the prosecutor at Bonin's Los Angeles County trial as "a signature, a trademark".

Initially formally arraigned for the murder of Grabs on July 25, by July 29, Bonin had been charged with an additional fifteen murders to which he had confessed and upon which the prosecution believed they had sufficient evidence to obtain a conviction. In addition to the sixteen murder indictments, Bonin was also charged with eleven counts of robbery, one count of sodomy, and one count of mayhem. He was held without bond.

On August 8, all charges were formally submitted against Bonin. Three days later, in accordance with Penal Code section 987, Bonin–at this stage without legal representation–was appointed attorney Earl Hanson to act as his legal representative. Hanson remained Bonin's attorney until October 1981 when, at Bonin's request, he was replaced by William Charvet and Tracy Stewart.

Accomplices' arrest 

Based on Bonin's confession, police obtained a warrant authorizing a search of Butts' Lakewood property on the same date as Bonin's initial arraignment; this July 25 search uncovered evidence linking Butts to several of the murders to which Bonin had already confessed, and Butts was brought before a Municipal Court on July 29, charged with accompanying Bonin on six murders committed between August 1979 and April 1980. He was also charged with three counts of robbery. In a press statement relating to the police investigation into the murders issued on this date, the Los Angeles County Sheriff's Department stated: "Bonin and Butts are believed to be responsible for the kidnapping, torture and murder of at least 21 young males between May 1979 and June 1980", fourteen of which had been committed in their jurisdiction. This spokesperson added that five further murder charges would likely be filed against the men in Orange County in due course.

Despite initially proclaiming his innocence, Butts soon confessed to having accompanied Bonin upon each of the murder forays listed in each of the charges against him, and to have actively participated in the sexual abuse of several victims. In his confession, Butts claimed to have participated in the murders primarily out of fear, claiming, "It was either go, or become the next victim", adding he only found the courage to confess upon learning Bonin was in custody. Butts was adamant he had had only a limited role in the actual torture of the victims, but confessed to actively participating in the torture of one victim.

Discussing the actual murder forays, Butts claimed that, upon their successfully luring a victim into the van, he would typically drive a short distance before stopping the vehicle in order to assist Bonin in restraining their victim before driving in an aimless manner as Bonin abused and tortured their captive in the rear of the van. Butts claimed his participation in the murders was typically limited to restraining the victims, although he admitted to mutilating one victim with a wire coat hanger. When asked why some victims had been subjected to more extensive blunt force trauma than others, Butts stated that, in many instances, Bonin would escalate the level of beatings to which he subjected his victim if the youth resisted his sexual advances.

Butts was brought before Orange County Municipal Court Judge Richard Orozco on November 14, 1980. On this date, he was formally charged with participating in three further murders committed in this county. His trial was scheduled for July 27, 1981.

On July 31, Munro was arrested in his hometown of Port Huron, Michigan; he was extradited to California and charged with the murder of Wells. Munro pleaded innocent to all charges against him on August 14. On August 22, Miley – by this stage 19 years old – was arrested in Texas and subsequently charged by California authorities with the murders of Miranda and Macabe. Miley was arrested after having confessed to his culpability in the Miranda and Macabe murders in a recorded phone conversation with a friend (thus substantiating Bonin's earlier confession). He initially pleaded innocent to two charges of first-degree murder on December 18, but pleaded guilty at two separate pretrial hearings in May 1981.

Preliminary hearings 
At a preliminary hearing held in Los Angeles County before Los Angeles County Superior Court Judge Julius Leetham on January 2, 1981, Bonin formally pleaded innocent to fourteen first-degree murder charges and numerous counts of sodomy, robbery and mayhem. In eleven of these indictments, a felony-murder-robbery special circumstance was also alleged. Bonin was ordered to return to court on January 7 for pretrial motions and the formal setting of a trial date. On the same date (January 2), Butts was arraigned on five counts of murder, in addition to three counts of robbery. The date of Butts' formal plea was delayed by Judge Leetham until January 7.

Four days after his formal plea before Judge Leetham, Butts committed suicide by hanging himself with a towel in his cell. A subsequent coroner's investigation revealed Butts had unsuccessfully attempted to take his own life on at least four occasions prior to his arrest. His attorney, Joe Ingber, theorized that Butts' depressive state had been magnified by the impending release of transcripts of his client's testimony at the preliminary hearing, in which Butts had graphically described the torture the victims had endured prior to their murder.

Three months prior to Butts' suicide, he had rejected an offer to plead guilty to all charges filed against him in exchange for a life sentence with a minimum of 25 years before the possibility of parole. At the time of Butts' suicide, he had not agreed to accept any form of plea bargain, or to testify against Bonin.

Both Miley and Munro agreed to testify against Bonin at his impending trials in exchange for being spared the death penalty, with Deputy District Attorney Stirling Norris also agreeing to seek the dismissal of additional charges of sodomy and robbery filed against Munro if he honored his agreement to testify. In the case of Miley, Norris agreed to accept two separate pleas of guilty to first-degree murder in exchange for two concurrent sentences of life imprisonment, with a possibility of parole after 25 years, if Miley agreed to testify against Bonin at both upcoming trials. William Pugh also agreed to testify, having pled guilty to one count of voluntary manslaughter for which he later received six years in prison.

Murder trials

Los Angeles County 
Bonin was brought to trial in Los Angeles County, charged with the murder of twelve of his victims whose bodies had been found within this constituency, on October 19, 1981. He was tried before Superior Court Judge William Keene. The trial commenced on November 5, 1981.

Norris, acting as prosecutor, sought the death penalty for each count of murder for which Bonin was tried, stating in his opening speech to the jury: "We will prove he is the Freeway Killer, as he has bragged to a number of witnesses. We will show you that he enjoyed the killings. Not only did he enjoy it, and plan to enjoy it, he had an insatiable demand, an insatiable appetite – not only for sodomy, but for killing." Norris further elaborated that Bonin had followed a depressingly familiar routine in his murders of luring or forcing his victim into his van before overpowering and binding his victim. He would then repeatedly rape his captive between and throughout instances of torture, before finally reaching the "climax of the orgy" by killing his victim. Norris further asserted that Bonin considered murder a group sport, and would typically groom people of a low mentality to participate in many of his murders.

Miley and Munro testified against Bonin at his Los Angeles County trial, describing in graphic detail the murders in which they had accompanied Bonin. In his testimony, delivered on November 17, Munro stated that shortly after the murder of Wells, he and Bonin drove to a McDonald's restaurant and purchased hamburgers with $10 taken from Wells' wallet. As they had eaten the burgers at Bonin's home, Bonin laughed and mused: "Thanks, Steve, wherever you are" before Munro had also joined in the laughter. Miley testified to his participation in the murders of Miranda and Macabe, describing in graphic detail how the two victims were beaten and tortured with various instruments before their murders, and how he had heard a "bunch of bones cracking" as Bonin had pressed a tire iron against Miranda's neck. Miley continued his testimony with the words: "The kid vomited. I jumped down on him the same way, killing the guy." Several members of the audience hastily left the courtroom as Bonin's accomplices delivered their testimony, later stating to reporters gathered outside the courtroom they had found the recited details too nauseating.

The strategy of Bonin's defense attorneys, Charvet and Stewart, was to challenge the credibility of numerous prosecution witnesses, and to suggest that extremely significant mitigating factors as to the root causes of Bonin's behavior lay in the extensive physical, sexual, and emotional abuse he had endured throughout his early life. To support this contention, Bonin's defense attorneys summoned Dr. David Foster, an expert on the developmental effects of violence and abuse on children, to testify as to the conclusions of the psychological examinations he had conducted on Bonin. Foster opined that as a result of repeated abandonment as a child, Bonin had not received the nurturing, protection, and behavioral feedback necessary for sufficient psychological development. Foster also stated the pervasive physical, sexual and emotional abuse had been so consistent and prevalent that Bonin held a confusion as to the differences between violence and love.

In a direct rebuttal, the prosecution summoned forensic psychiatrist Park Dietz, a noted expert in impulse control disorder and sexual sadism disorder, who testified that the overall pattern of Bonin's behavior was inconsistent with an inability to control his impulses. Dietz further testified as to Bonin's actions being reflective of planning as opposed to impulsive behavior. In summary, Dietz concluded that Bonin was a sexual sadist, and that although he suffered from an antisocial personality disorder, neither of these conditions had impaired his ability to control his actions.

On November 24, prison inmate Lloyd Douglas testified that Bonin had bragged to him of his culpability in the Freeway Killer murders while both were incarcerated in the Los Angeles County Jail in the summer of 1980. According to Douglas, Bonin had held a newspaper article aloft before saying to him: "These are the little boys I got ahold of". Douglas then outlined a number of salacious allegations regarding Bonin's torture of victims that were otherwise not supported with valid evidence. In cross-examination, Douglas conceded he had only related these claims to authorities after pleading guilty to the filing of charges of voluntary manslaughter and second-degree burglary against him and that he had been released from custody the previous month. Douglas also testified to being the cousin of victim Lawrence Sharp.

Against overruled objections from Bonin's defense attorney, Fresno-based reporter David López waived his previously sought immunity under California's shield law and agreed to testify on behalf of the prosecution as to the details of seven interviews Bonin had granted him between December 1980 and April 1981. In his testimony, delivered on December 14 and 15, López stated Bonin had first informed him he would refuse to talk with any other reporter if López would agree not to broadcast the precise details of the interview. López had agreed to these conditions, and Bonin had confessed to him on January 9 that he was indeed the Freeway Killer and that he had killed 21 victims. The victims' ages, Bonin had confided, had ranged between 12 and 19, with his youngest victim, Macabe, being the easiest victim to kill. According to López, Bonin had confided that although he resented the prospect of being executed, he had opted to kill repeatedly simply because he had enjoyed the "sound of kids dying". López also testified Bonin had informed him he had killed one victim by repeatedly punching him in the throat, and that the primary incentive for his revealing the location of King's body to authorities had actually been his knowledge police would purchase a hamburger for him as they searched San Bernardino County for the remains. López further stated that when he asked Bonin what he would be doing if he were still at large, Bonin had replied: "I'd still be killing, I couldn't stop killing. It got easier with each one we did."

Upon cross-examination, Bonin's defense attorney ensured that López conceded that his testimony was based upon what he had recalled from the interviews as opposed to any handwritten notes, although he strenuously denied he had received any form of payment to testify.

Closing arguments lasted from December 16 to 22, 1981. In his closing argument on behalf of the prosecution, Norris described Bonin as an insatiable, callous individual who acted with malice aforethought, and who derived extreme pleasure from the suffering he inflicted upon his victims. Norris outlined the torture Bonin's victims had endured before concluding his closing arguments by urging the jury to "give him [Bonin] what he has earned".

Defense attorney Charvet began his closing argument on December 21. Although Charvet did not specifically ask the jurors to find Bonin not guilty, he did request they only return the "reasonable verdict you can bring", indicating a likelihood of not guilty verdicts on at least some counts upon which Bonin stood charged. Charvet then hearkened towards the credibility of some of the delivered testimony, pouring particular scorn upon Miley and Munro, whom he emphasized had turned state's evidence and thus, he alleged, had tailored their testimony to the desires of the police. As such, Charvet called their testimony unbelievable.

Charvet repeatedly reminded the jury he had exposed myriad inconsistencies in the testimony of Munro's account of the murder of Wells in the various statements he had given, and had compelled him to admit that he lied on numerous occasions. He also reminded the jury of the extensive abuse Bonin had endured as a child, of the testimony of Dr. Foster, and of the diagnoses doctors at the Atascadero hospital had reached between 1969 and 1971. Contending the prosecution's case was "full of holes", he then alleged the prosecution had resorted to what amounted to little more than "revulsion tactics" in the hope Bonin would be convicted upon that basis.

Following these closing arguments, Judge Keene ordered the trial recessed until December 28, when he delivered his final instructions to the jury, who then formally began their deliberations.

Conviction 
Bonin's first trial lasted until January 6, 1982. On this date, the jury convicted Bonin of ten of the murders for which he was tried, although he was found not guilty of the murders of Lundgren and King, of committing sodomy upon Grabs, of committing mayhem upon Lundgren, and of robbing one other victim. As these verdicts were read by the clerk of court, many relatives and friends of Bonin's victims wept openly. The following day, the prosecution and defense made alternate pleas for the actual sentence the jury should decide, with Norris requesting the death penalty and Charvet requesting life imprisonment. On January 20, the jury further found that the special circumstances required within California state law (multiple murders and robbery) had been met in the ten murder cases for which they had found Bonin guilty, and thus unanimously recommended he receive the death penalty.

Bonin was cleared of the sodomy and murder of King because he had led police to the body of the victim in December 1980, with the agreement that his leading police to the body could not be used against him in court, and therefore the prosecutors had discussed King's disappearance at the trial, but not the discovery of his body. He was cleared of the charges of mayhem and murder against Lundgren because, according to López, he had strenuously denied committing this particular killing in the interviews he had granted to him.

Sentencing 
In response to the recommendations of the jury, Judge Keene ordered a reconvening of court on February 24. On this date, Charvet argued for a modification of the sentence recommended by the jury. Despite an impassioned appeal by Charvet, on March 12, Keene formally sentenced Bonin to death for the ten murders for which he had been convicted. Describing the murders as "a gross, revolting affront to human dignity", Keene further ordered at this hearing that if Bonin's death sentence were commuted to one of life imprisonment, the sentences should run consecutively. Bonin was then ordered to be remanded to the warden of San Quentin State Prison, to await execution in the gas chamber. He remained unmoved upon receipt of this sentence, having earlier informed his attorney he fully expected to formally receive the death penalty.

Prior to his scheduled second trial in Orange County, Bonin was temporarily removed from death row and held in solitary confinement, where he remained until the conclusion of this trial. This security measure was largely due to the fact he had previously received a severe beating by an incarcerated gang member with whom he had shared a cell. While incarcerated in this capacity, Charvet attempted to secure a change of venue, citing the extensive pretrial publicity surrounding the case in the county minimizing the chances of securing an untainted jury within the jurisdiction; however, this motion was refused by Judge Kenneth Lae, who ruled in November 1982 that there had only been minimal publicity surrounding the Freeway Killer case in Orange County following Bonin's earlier convictions.

Orange County 
Bonin was brought to trial in Orange County, charged with the robbery and murder of four further victims who had been found murdered within this jurisdiction between November 1979 and May 1980, on March 21, 1983. He was tried before Superior Court Judge Kenneth Lae.

Initial jury selection began on this date, and saw a total of 204 prospective jurors subjected to the process of voir dire selection until sixteen were picked in June. Upon completion of the jury selection process, Bonin's attorney renewed an earlier filed motion that the trial should be moved to a jurisdiction outside of Orange County due to pretrial publicity tainting the jury pool; this renewed motion was again rejected by Lae, who ruled that the trial would begin on June 14.

The prosecutor at Bonin's Orange County trial, Bryan Brown, contended that all four victims killed within this constituency had been abducted while hitchhiking, then ordered to strip before being bound about the wrists and ankles. Each of the four victims had then endured rape, beatings, torture, and finally ligature strangulation. In each instance, the ligature had left an impression measuring approximately one-half of an inch upon the victim's neck. Brown also hearkened toward the similarities in each of these murders and two of those for which Bonin had earlier been convicted in Los Angeles County: Miranda and Wells. Particular emphasis was placed upon the fiber evidence found upon each of the Orange County victims – in addition to three victims killed in Los Angeles County – being a precise match to the distinctive carpeting in the rear of Bonin's van. As such, Brown stated, the four Orange County victims had been killed by the same individual who had killed Miranda and Wells, and his accomplices in these two murders, Miley and Munro, would testify as to their accompanying Bonin on each of these murders. To further support this contention, the prosecution also presented forensic experts who testified that the fibers discovered upon the bodies of all six victims in question were a precise match with the carpeting in Bonin's van. The interior of the van had also been extensively stained with human blood. In reference to the evidence found within the van itself, Brown stated to the jury: "One can truly say from the evidence found within the van it is a virtual death wagon."

These contentions were refuted by Charvet, who contended that any similarities in modus operandi did not constitute automatic proof of his client's guilt, and that the evidence presented did not support the prosecution's contention beyond a reasonable doubt that Bonin had murdered any of the four Orange County victims, or the two victims killed in Los Angeles County. Specifically, Charvet attacked the credibility of Munro, and further contended Bonin was simply a scapegoat for four unsolved murders. Charvet also argued before the jury that Brown had "spent more time discussing the two Los Angeles cases" for which Bonin had previously been convicted than actually proving Bonin had committed any of the Orange County murders.

During the six-week trial, Bonin's attorneys called two witnesses in his defense – one of whom was Munro, who conceded Bonin had communicated with him prior to his testifying in this second trial, requesting he lie when called to deliver his testimony.

Second conviction 
On August 1, both counsels delivered their closing arguments before the jury, who then retired to consider their verdicts. The jury deliberated for less than three hours before announcing on August 2 that they had found Bonin guilty of each of the four murders, in addition to three counts of robbery.

After three days of deliberations as to the actual penalty to be imposed upon Bonin, the jury announced on August 22 their recommendations that he be sentenced to death on each count. Judge Lae postponed formal sentencing until August 26. On this date, Bonin received four further death sentences, with Lae describing Bonin as sadistic and guilty of "monstrous criminal conduct".

Following his Orange County convictions, Bonin was transferred from the Orange County jail to San Quentin State Prison, to await execution in the gas chamber.

Death row 
In his years on death row, Bonin undertook painting and writing as hobbies. He wrote a series of short stories called Doing Time: Stories from the Mind of a Death Row Prisoner with 50 copies initially printed and published at $13 a copy. He also held hopes of publishing a science fiction novel. Over the years, Bonin received several minor awards for his artwork, short stories and poems.

Bonin also corresponded with numerous individuals, including the mothers of some of his victims, although he never expressed any regret or remorse over having murdered their sons, purposefully withholding information his victims' families sought and seemingly deriving pleasure from their discontent. On one occasion, Bonin informed the mother of victim Sean King that her son had been his favorite victim as "he was such a screamer".

Shortly after Bonin's arrival at San Quentin State Prison, he became close friends with serial killer Lawrence Bittaker, whom he had previously been incarcerated with at Los Angeles County jail. Bonin also became acquainted with convicted murderers Randy Kraft (one of the other two murderers who shared with Bonin the nickname "Freeway Killer"), Douglas Clark, and Jimmy Lee Smith.

Bonin also contended to both his defense attorneys and to several people with whom he corresponded while upon death row that Butts had been the actual ringleader behind the murders, and that he had simply been Butts' accomplice. These claims would be refuted by the prosecutor at Bonin's Los Angeles County murder trial, Stirling Norris, who recollected shortly before Bonin's execution: "He was the leader, and he chose weak people he could use."

The method of Bonin's execution was superseded by lethal injection by the state of California in 1992, following the execution of Robert Alton Harris (the first inmate California had executed since 1967). Harris had exhibited evident symptoms of discomfort for up to four minutes throughout his fifteen-minute execution in the gas chamber. These symptoms had included convulsions. As such, the state of California opted to use lethal injection as an alternate method of execution to the gas chamber, branding the gas chamber a "cruel and unusual" method of execution.

Appeals 
Bonin filed numerous appeals against his convictions and sentencing, citing issues such as jury prejudice, the potential of jury inflammation via listening to numerous victim impact statements (to which his defense counsel had offered to stipulate), and inadequate defense as the bases for each appeal. For these appeals, Bonin hired new lawyers, who initially submitted contentions that his previous defense attorney, Charvet, had provided inadequate defense at his trials by failing to place sufficient emphasis upon Bonin's bipolar disorder and the sexual abuse he had endured as a child. These lawyers contended that had Charvet placed further emphasis on these issues, Bonin would have been "humanized" in the eyes of his juries. Each successive appeal proved unsuccessful, with the U.S. Supreme Court refusing to overturn Bonin's death penalty convictions in August 1988 and January 1989.

Despite upholding Bonin's convictions, the Supreme Court poured scorn upon Judge Keene for failing to fully heed a warning given by the prosecution prior to the Los Angeles County trial that Munro had discussed the possibility of agreeing to legal representation by Charvet prior to his testimony. Despite admonishing Charvet for a potential conflict of interest, Judge Keene had permitted him to act as Bonin's defense attorney at his first trial. In spite of this fact, the Supreme Court ruled in 1989 that Charvet had effectively cross-examined Munro at trial, and that Keene's actions, though ruled as "inexplicable", had not effectively harmed Bonin's legal defense. Further merit was given to Bonin's contention that his defense should have been allowed to stipulate to the testimony of the parents of his victims, rather than their being allowed to identify photographs of their sons in both life and death at his trials. Despite this ruling, this finding was also deemed not to have affected the overall verdict.

A final submission to the United States Court of Appeals was submitted in October 1994, with Bonin contending such issues as his being denied the effective assistance of counsel at his trials, that he had been denied due process at his Los Angeles trial due to the judge's refusal to suppress the testimony of Munro and Miley, that Charvet failed to point out Bonin's brain damage and other mitigating circumstances, and that the judge at his Orange County trial had denied his counsel's motion for a change of venue upon the basis that pretrial publicity had effectively minimized any chance of obtaining an unbiased jury within the county. This final appeal was rejected on June 28, 1995, with the appellate judges stating they had found no evidence of legal misconduct, and that no evidence existed that the 13 jurors who served upon Bonin's Orange County trial who had admitted to minimal, indirect pretrial exposure to the Freeway Killer case had, as a result of this pretrial publicity, been incapable of judging Bonin with impartiality. As such, the appellate judges declared their satisfaction with the validity of Bonin's convictions, concluding that Bonin's verdict would not have changed with further mitigating circumstances revealed. The various experts who had examined Bonin would also find conflict with one another's assertions, with Dr. Park Dietz opining that fellow Dr. David Foster largely mischaracterized and exaggerated the evidence relied in proving Bonin was extensively abused as a child, and was mistaken in assuming Bonin's Babinski reflex and other symptoms – which were initially speculated to indicate attention deficit disorder or another minor disorder – were indicative of extensive brain damage that influenced Bonin's crimes. In addition, a neurologist's magnetic resonance imaging and electroencephalogram tests conducted on Bonin would reveal that he had minimal, if any, brain anomalies indicative of damage.

On February 20, 1996, the Ninth Circuit Court of Appeals rejected a plea for clemency submitted by Bonin's attorneys on the grounds of inadequate legal representation at both his trials. Scarcely one hour prior to his scheduled execution, the Supreme Court refused to hear Bonin's final plea to overturn his death sentence, with the convened panel in almost unanimous agreement that Bonin's own attorneys had not failed to give their client adequate legal representation by not earlier discovering their submitted claims to have discovered evidence attesting to Bonin's innocence. Furthermore, these appellate judges ruled that Bonin's attorneys should not have waited until the last minute to submit arguments to overturn or postpone the impending death sentence of their client. These convened judges also rejected Bonin's final claim that he had a right to choose between the gas chamber or lethal injection as his actual method of execution.

Execution 
Bonin was executed by lethal injection inside the gas chamber at San Quentin State Prison on February 23, 1996. He was the first person to be executed by lethal injection in the history of California, and his execution occurred fourteen years after his first death sentence had been imposed.

In a final interview given to a local radio station less than 24 hours before he was executed, Bonin claimed he had "made peace" with the fact he was about to die, adding that his only major regret in life was that he had not pursued his teenage passion of bowling long enough to have turned professional. He expressed his disagreement with the State's decision to execute him, stating: "A lot of people believe I should die for what I [have done]. I don't agree" before further elaborating: "I have no anger towards anybody, but that doesn't mean I don't think the death penalty is wrong."

Bonin denied any responsibility for his actions in this interview, stating "I can say that I feel that these people [believe I am] guilty and [that] they feel when I'm executed, that will put a closure to it. But that is not the case and they're going to find that out."
 He opined that he was not the same person he was during his spree of crimes, and would not be able to live a normal life outside of prison as a result. Insisting that he had no control over his actions, Bonin claimed his urge to kill was too strong to resist before expressing his hope the Lord "will understand me, and know that I [could not] help what I did."

At 6 p.m. on the day he was executed, Bonin was moved from his cell to a death watch cell, where he ordered his last meal: two large pizzas, three pints of ice cream and three six-packs of Coke, which he ate while watching an episode of Jeopardy!. His final hours were spent in the company of five individuals whom he had chosen for this occasion. These included his attorney, chaplain, and a prospective biographer. Each later stated that Bonin seemed resigned to his fate; his attorney also added that he had not detected any remorse in his client.

At 11:45 p.m., Bonin was escorted from his holding cell into the execution chamber. In his final statement, given to the prison warden one hour prior to his scheduled execution at midnight, Bonin again expressed no remorse for his crimes and left a note that stated:

Bonin was pronounced dead at 12:13 a.m. He was 49 at the time of his execution. None of Bonin's relatives chose to witness his execution, although the event was witnessed by several relatives of his victims, many of whom wept and embraced when his death was officially confirmed. According to several of these witnesses, Bonin's execution passed without complications, and he was heavily sedated throughout the latter stages of the procedure. On this subject, then-Governor Pete Wilson, who had rejected a submitted plea for clemency from Bonin's attorneys three days prior to the execution, referred to Bonin as the "poster boy for capital punishment" before adding that California's method of execution ensured his death was infinitely more pleasant than that endured by his victims.

Known victims 
Bonin and three of his four known accomplices were convicted of fourteen murders committed between August 5, 1979, and June 2, 1980; Bonin was also charged with two additional murders for which he was acquitted at his first trial in Los Angeles County. Of these murders for which Bonin was convicted, ten were committed in Los Angeles County and four in nearby Orange County. Bonin was suspected of committing at least 21 murders, and the killings for which he was convicted are shown in italics:

1979
 Thomas Glen Lundgren (13): Disappeared and found on May 28, 1979, in Los Angeles County; emasculated, bludgeoned, stabbed, slashed his throat, and fatally strangled.
  Mark Duane Shelton (17): Disappeared on August 4, 1979, and found on August 11, 1979, in San Bernardino County; sodomised with various objects and unintentionally killed after he went into shock.
 Markus Alexander Grabs (17): Disappeared on August 5, 1979, and found on August 6, 1979, in Los Angeles County; sodomised, beaten, and fatally stabbed 77 times.
 Donald Ray Hyden (15): Disappeared and found on August 27, 1979, in Los Angeles County; stabbed in the neck and genitals, strangled, and fatally bludgeoned. 
 David Louis Murillo (17): Disappeared on September 9, 1979, and found on September 10, 1979, in Los Angeles County; raped, bludgeoned, and fatally strangled. 
 Robert Christopher Wirostek (18): Disappeared on September 17, 1979, and found on September 27, 1979, in Orange County; raped and strangled to death with ligature after being assaulted with a tire iron. 
 Kern County John Doe (15–27): Body found on November 1, 1979, in Kern County; strangled with ligature and died from penetration of the head with an ice pick. 
 Frank Dennis Fox (17): Disappeared on November 30, 1979, and found on December 2, 1979, in Orange County; raped and fatally strangled with ligature after going into shock from sodomy.
 John Fredrick Kilpatrick (15): Disappeared on December 5, 1979, and found on December 13, 1979, in Los Angeles County; strangled to death with ligature after being flagellated with string.

1980
 Michael Francis McDonald (16): Disappeared and found on January 1, 1980, in San Bernardino County; mutilated and strangled to death with ligature after being assaulted. 
 Charles Dempster Miranda (15): Disappeared and found on February 3, 1980, in Los Angeles County; raped, beaten, and fatally strangled with a tire iron.
 James Michael Macabe (12): Disappeared and found on February 3, 1980, in Los Angeles County; raped, beaten, and fatally strangled with his own T-shirt. 
 Ronald Craig Gatlin (18): Disappeared on March 14, 1980, and found on March 15, 1980, in Los Angeles County; sodomised with an ice pick and fatally strangled.
 Glenn Norman Barker (14): Disappeared on March 21, 1980, and found on March 23, 1980, in Los Angeles County; raped, beaten, assaulted with an ice pick, burned with a lit cigarette, and fatally strangled.
 Russell Duane Rugh (15): Disappeared on March 21, 1980, and found on March 23, 1980, in San Diego County; strangled to death with ligature and assaulted. 
 Harry Todd Turner (15): Disappeared on March 25, 1980, and found on March 26, 1980, in Los Angeles County; sodomised, bit, beaten, bludgeoned, and fatally strangled with his own T-shirt. 
 Steven John Wood (16): Disappeared and found on April 4, 1980,  in Los Angeles County; strangled to death with ligature. 
 Darin Lee Kendrick (19): Disappeared on April 29, 1980, and found on May 1, 1980, in Los Angeles County; forced to drink hydrochloric acid and fatally stabbed in the ear with an ice pick by accomplice Vernon Butts after being chemically poisoned by Bonin.
 Lawrence Eugene Sharp (17): Disappeared on May 10, 1980, and found on May 18, 1980, in Los Angeles County; beaten and killed by strangulation. 
 Sean Paige King (14): Disappeared on May 19, 1980, and found on May 20, 1980, in San Bernardino County; raped and killed by strangulation.
 Steven Jay Wells (18):  Disappeared on June 2, 1980, and found on June 3, 1980, in Orange County; raped, beaten, and fatally strangled with his own T-shirt. 

Footnotes
 In nine murders; those of Lundgren, Shelton, Grabs, Hyden, Murillo, Wirostek, Kendrick, Wells and the John Doe whose skeletal remains had been found in Kern County on November 30, 1979, Bonin was assisted by his primary accomplice, Vernon Butts, a factory worker who had been 21-years-old when he committed his first murder with Bonin. According to Bonin, Butts had been an extremely active accomplice.
 Bonin was assisted by 19-year-old Gregory Miley in the February 3 murders of Miranda and Macabe. Miley then returned to his native Houston in the spring of 1980 to live with his stepfather. He was arrested on August 22.
 James Munro, Bonin's lodger and coworker, assisted Bonin in the murder of Steven Wells. The day after Bonin's arrest, Munro fled to his native Michigan, where he was arrested on July 31.
 Through questioning Bonin's neighbor, Everett Fraser, police discovered that 17-year-old William Pugh, who had informed police he suspected Bonin of being the Freeway Killer, actually knew Bonin much better than he had initially divulged. Police later learned Pugh – a juvenile delinquent with a lengthy criminal record – had willingly accompanied Bonin in the murder of Harry Todd Turner. As a direct result of this knowledge, first-degree murder charges against 20-year-old acquaintance of Bonin's Eric Marten Wijnaendts – brought in December 1980 – were dropped in January 1981, with the county prosecutor citing insufficient evidence as the cause.
 Bonin was not brought to trial for the murders of Mark Shelton, Robert Wirostek, John Kilpatrick, Michael McDonald, or the John Doe whose body was found in November 1979 because police did not find sufficient evidence upon any of the victims' bodies which could conclusively link Bonin alone to the crimes. Police did charge Bonin and Butts with the murder of the John Doe, and those of Mark Shelton and Robert Wirostek (alongside that of Darin Kendrick) in October and November 1980. Bonin was formally charged with these murders at a pretrial hearing held on January 2, 1981.
 Shelton had been linked to the manhunt for the Freeway Killer upon the discovery of his body in August 1979, as had Darin Kendrick and the unidentified victim whose location was reported to police by Butts. Wirostek, who vanished en route to his job on September 17, 1979, was not confirmed as a Freeway Killer victim until his body was formally identified in July 1980.
 Two months after all charges had been filed against each defendant, Butts committed suicide, rendering his recorded testimony in these three cases inadmissible as evidence. The charges against Bonin in relation to Shelton, Wirostek and the John Doe were therefore dropped in accordance with Penal Code section 995 in early 1981. Nonetheless, sufficient physical evidence was still present in the case of Darin Kendrick – a murder for which Bonin was subsequently convicted.
 Neither Bonin nor any of his accomplices were ever charged with the murders of John Kilpatrick or Michael McDonald, although Bonin confessed to their killings to David López.
 Bonin was charged with, but subsequently cleared of, the murders of Sean King and Thomas Lundgren at his Los Angeles County trial. He is known to have confessed to the murder of King, and led police to his body; he emphatically denied Lundgren's murder in the series of interviews granted to David López between December 1980 and January 1981, although Bonin stated in these interviews he had killed 21 victims.

Other "Freeway Killers" 
On July 1, 1977, Patrick Kearney, the prime suspect in a series of killings of young men known as the "Trash Bag Murders", voluntarily surrendered to Riverside police. Prior to his surrender, Kearney had been a fugitive for two months, following his being forensically linked to the murder of 17-year-old John LaMay – a confirmed victim of the Trash Bag Murderer. Kearney subsequently confessed to the murders of 28 boys and young men; many of whose bodies he had discarded alongside freeways in southern California. He was sentenced to twenty-one terms of life imprisonment.

In contrast to Bonin, Kearney extensively dismembered the majority of his victims' bodies before typically discarding their remains in trash bags. Although primarily known as the "Trash Bag Murderer", Kearney is also known as the Freeway Killer.

Three years after the arrest of Bonin, two California Highway Patrol officers arrested 38-year-old Randy Kraft as he attempted to discard the body of a 25-year-old Marine from his car in Mission Viejo. The victim had been drugged, bound and garroted in a similar manner to that of numerous other young men whose bodies had been found alongside or close to various California and Oregon freeways since 1972. A search of Kraft's vehicle revealed an envelope containing over fifty Polaroid pictures of young men – either drugged or deceased – in suggestive poses. Several of these images depicted confirmed victims of Kraft. Police also discovered a coded list depicting cryptic references to his victims in the trunk of Kraft's vehicle, leading Kraft to also become known as the "Scorecard Killer."

Although Kraft's disposal method had been similar to that of Bonin, Kraft drugged his victims before he killed them and used differing torture methods upon their bodies, including burning the victims' chests and genitals with an automobile cigarette lighter. In addition, many of his victims had been aged in their early- or mid-twenties, and a small number of his victims had also been dismembered prior to their disposal. Collectively, Bonin, Kraft and Kearney may have claimed up to 131 victims.

Aftermath 
Four months following Bonin's arrest, Bonin's 61-year-old father died of cirrhosis of the liver on October 11, 1980. His condition sourced from his excessive alcohol addiction. Bonin's family refused to claim his remains in the weeks following his 1996 execution. His remains were cremated in a private ceremony with none of his family members present. Bonin's ashes were later scattered over the Pacific Ocean.

Three weeks after Bonin's execution, authorities discovered that his mother had openly exploited an administrative error pertaining to her son's social security disability payments – which Bonin had begun receiving for a mental disability in 1972 and which should have terminated upon his 1982 imprisonment – to maintain payments on her Downey home. This administrative error – totaling approximately $79,424 – was only discovered after a funeral director notified the Social Security Administration of Bonin's death. Alice Benton subsequently agreed to pay restitution for receiving these payments in March 1996, claiming neither she or her son were aware of the illegality of their actions.

Throughout Bonin's trials and in the years of his subsequent incarceration on death row, experts devoted much speculation and debate as to whether the root cause of his crimes lay in his extremely abusive and dysfunctional upbringing. One of Bonin's lawyers was quoted as stating it was "virtually impossible for [Bonin] to be a successful human being" given the various extreme childhood abuses he had endured, with a prospective biographer also opining that Bonin was essentially unable to handle minute problems in his day-to-day life due to past trauma. Opponents and advocates of the death penalty alike were in agreement Bonin had endured extensive physical, emotional and sexual abuse throughout his childhood, but much scorn was given to the claims from his attorneys and supporters that his murders had been a direct manifestation of the abuse he had endured, and an attempt to purge his frustration and anger onto his victims. In one article published in the San Francisco Chronicle three days prior to Bonin's execution, editor Robert Morse opined:

Butts, who was accused of accompanying or otherwise assisting Bonin on at least nine of the murders, hanged himself while awaiting trial on January 11, 1981. He left no suicide note. At the time of his death, he had been scheduled to be tried on July 27 for six of the murders he had accompanied Bonin upon. Correspondence found within his cell indicated Butts had been greatly distressed at the impending release of a transcript of evidence he had given behind closed doors at his preliminary hearing days prior, and the effect it would have on his friends and relatives. Despite claiming in his formal confession to investigators shortly after his arrest that he had basically participated in the murders out of fear of Bonin, Butts also informed investigators he had considered the killing spree "a good little nightmare", adding that Bonin "really loved those sounds of screams. He loved to hear them scream ... he loved every minute of it."

McVicker, the youth who had survived the 1974 assault and partial strangulation at Bonin's hands and who personally witnessed Bonin's execution, was traumatized by his ordeal for several years. He was haunted by nightmares on a nightly basis concerning the incident, dropped out of high school and became dependent on drugs and alcohol. Nonetheless, he described the experience of observing the execution as being symbolic of closure and "the beginning of my life." In the years following Bonin's execution, McVicker has actively campaigned to ensure that his accomplices, Miley and Munro, remain incarcerated. In one interview granted in 2011, McVicker stated the primary reason he had been inspired to campaign against their release were the words one of the victims' mothers had spoken to him after he had testified at Bonin's first trial: "You've got to speak for my kid."

Munro was sentenced to a term of fifteen years to life for the second degree murder of Steven Wells on April 6, 1981. He has repeatedly appealed his sentence, claiming that he had not known Bonin had been the Freeway Killer until after Wells' murder, and that he had been tricked into accepting a plea bargain whereby he pleaded guilty to this second degree murder charge. He has also written to successive governors, requesting he be executed rather than spend the remainder of his life behind bars for what he claims is "a crime I didn't commit". (In the days immediately following the murder of Wells and prior to Bonin's arrest, Munro boasted to several colleagues of his belief the Freeway Killer would never be caught.) Munro has repeatedly been denied parole and is incarcerated at Mule Creek State Prison. He is next available for parole in 2029.

Miley was sentenced to a term of 25 years to life for the first-degree murder of Charles Miranda by Superior Court Judge Bonnie Lee Smith on February 5, 1982. On this date, Miley was informed he would need to serve a minimum of sixteen years and eight months before he would be considered for parole. He was later sentenced to a concurrent term of 25 years to life by an Orange County court judge for the abduction and murder of James Macabe. Initially incarcerated at the California Substance Abuse Treatment Facility and State Prison, Corcoran in Corcoran, California, Miley was later transferred to Mule Creek State Prison. Throughout the years of his incarceration, Miley was repeatedly reprimanded for violating prison rules. These accrued reprimands had included the possession of contraband drugs, and attempting to engage in non-consensual sodomy with fellow inmates.

On May 25, 2016, Miley died of injuries he had sustained two days previously, when he had been attacked by another inmate in an exercise yard at Mule Creek State Prison. Initially, he was evaluated at the prison medical facility before returning to his cell; he was later airlifted to hospital after falling into unconsciousness two hours after the attack. At the time of Miley's death, his next scheduled parole hearing was to be held in 2019. He had most recently been eligible for parole in October 2014, after previously agreeing to a three-year continuance of his most recent request for parole. This subsequent suitability hearing was held on October 29, 2014; the decision made at this hearing was to deny parole.

Pugh was sentenced to six years in prison for the voluntary manslaughter of Harry Turner on May 17, 1982. Pugh had initially been charged with the first-degree murder of Turner, in addition to companion charges of robbery and sodomy; however, after five days of deliberation, the jury found Pugh guilty of the reduced charge of manslaughter, and innocent of robbery and sodomy. He served less than four years of his sentence, and was released from prison in late 1985.

Media

Film 
 The film Freeway Killer was released by Image Entertainment in 2010. This film is directly based upon the murders committed by Bonin and his accomplices. The film cast Scott Anthony Leet as William Bonin and Dusty Sorg as Vernon Butts.

Bibliography

Television 

 History Channel original documentary series Infamous Murders analyzed the case in an episode in 2001 
 The Investigation Discovery channel has broadcast a documentary pertaining to Bonin. This 45-minute episode – entitled The Freeway Killer – was first broadcast in May 2014.
 The documentary series World's Most Evil Killers has featured an episode focusing upon the Freeway Killer murders. This episode was first broadcast in January 2021.
 The six-part ABC News TV serie City of Angels, City of Death examined his case from the perspective of lead detective Robert Souza in November 2021
 David McVicker told his story in an episode of A&E Networks series I Survived A Serial Killer in February 2022.

See also 

 Capital punishment in California
 List of people executed in California
 List of serial killers by number of victims
 List of serial killers in the United States

Notes

References

Cited works and further reading

External links 

 California Department of Corrections and Rehabilitation case summary upon William Bonin
 Contemporary news article detailing the execution of William Bonin
 Dead Man Waiting, as published in the San Francisco Chronicle, February 20, 1996
 L.A. Times news article detailing Bonin's lawyers' last-minute appeals to obtain a stay of execution
 William Bonin at CrimeLibrary.com
 People v. William Bonin: Details of Bonin's 1989 appeal against his convictions, submitted January 9, 1989
 William George Bonin v. Arthur Calderon: Details of Bonin's 1995 submission to the Court of Appeals for the Ninth Circuit, submitted June 28, 1995

1947 births
1996 deaths
1979 murders in the United States
1980 murders in the United States
20th-century executions by California
20th-century executions of American people
American male criminals
American murderers of children
American people convicted of child sexual abuse
American people convicted of robbery
American people convicted of sodomy
American prisoners sentenced to death
American rapists
Criminals from Los Angeles
Executed American serial killers
Executed people from Connecticut
Fugitives
Gay military personnel
Incidents of violence against boys
LGBT people from Connecticut
Male serial killers
Military personnel from Connecticut
People convicted of murder by California
People executed by California by lethal injection
People from Willimantic, Connecticut
People with sexual sadism disorder
People with antisocial personality disorder
People with bipolar disorder
Prisoners sentenced to death by California
Rape of males
Torture in the United States
United States Air Force airmen
United States Air Force personnel of the Vietnam War
Violence against men in North America